Flann Ó Riain (18 September 1929 – 6 December 2008) was an Irish cartoonist, writer and Irish language activist. He was born on 18 September 1929 in Lucan, Co. Dublin. He was primarily known for his work as a political cartoonist with the Irish Independent. Using the nom de plume, "Doll", he had a regular appearance in the newspaper where he created satirical cartoons. He was also known as creator of the 1960s Irish language television series Dáithí Lacha, and "Rí Rá agus Ruaille Buaille"

Early life 
Ó Riain was born in Lucan, Dublin to Edmund and Nora Ryan. His father, a member of the Garda Síochána, took a posting in Arranmore, County Donegal in order to foster his son's interest in the Irish language. From there, he attended numerous national schools throughout the country. From school, he attended St Patrick's College, Dublin graduating as a primary school teacher.

In 1977, he was imprisoned in Mountjoy Prison having been fined for refusing to pay his television license in a protest to what he saw as RTÉ's neglect of the Irish language. He was subsequently released after the fine was paid anonymously.

He also was a writer of books on history and language.

Books 

 Dáithí Lacha - (1965)
 Dáithí Lacha '67 - (1967)
 I gComhar le Doll -  (1970)
 Euphoria is a lovely word -  (1972)
 Suas agus Siós: Sórt Scéil -  (1976)
 Lazy Way to Irish -  (1995)
 Lazy Way to Welsh -  (1995)
 Scéal An "Union Paddy" -  (1995)
 Townlands of Leinster and the People Who Lived There -  (2000)
 Duanairí 1, illustrator - (1974)
 Lazy Way to Gaelic, illustrator -  (1995)

References 

1929 births
2009 deaths
Irish editorial cartoonists
Irish nationalists
Writers from County Dublin